The Hazel Wright Organ is an American pipe organ located in Christ Cathedral in Garden Grove, California. It is one of the world's largest pipe organs. As of 2019, it has 293 ranks and 17,106 pipes, fully playable from two 5-manual consoles.  The organ is called "Hazel" by fans. 

Before becoming Christ Cathedral, the building was known as The Crystal Cathedral, from which the Hour of Power was telecast. Funded by a $2 million gift from Hazel Wright, a viewer of that program, the organ was constructed by Fratelli Ruffatti based on specifications by Virgil Fox and expanded by Frederick Swann. It incorporates the large Aeolian-Skinner pipe organ originally built in 1962 for New York's Avery Fisher Hall, and the Ruffatti organ which had been installed in the church's previous sanctuary in 1977.

Beginning in 1982, the year of the present organ's dedication, Frederick Swann was organist and music director at the church. During his 16-year tenure (1982–1998), he was widely regarded as the most visible organist in the world as people in more than 165 countries worldwide saw and heard him playing the organ on the weekly Hour of Power televised episodes.

Following the Crystal Cathedral's final Hour of Power in June 2013, the organ was scheduled to be dismantled for a $2 million refurbishing, led by Fratelli Ruffatti, and then to be re-installed for the building's planned re-opening as Christ Cathedral. After three decades of use and exposure to heat, sunlight and water damage, the organ was in need of extensive repair. The organ was removed in February 2014 over the course of a week and shipped to Padua, Italy for restoration. The organ was returned to California in May 2016 and reinstalled by early 2020. Ruffati had to pause his work in March 2020 due to the COVID-19 pandemic and return to Italy. After the church spent $3 million, a fifth the cost of a brand new organ, Ruffati completed his work in January 2022 after the end of travel restrictions.

The organ was originally due to be rededicated on May 15, 2020, with a recital by organists Frederick Swann, Paul Jacobs, Hector Olivera, and expected recitals during 2020 include performances by Peter Conte, Chelsea Chen, Olivier Latry, and Stephen Tharp; all events were rescheduled to January 2021 and then canceled, . A concert rededicating the organ finally took place on September 30, 2022, featuring organist Hector Olivera.



Stoplist
The organ has the following stoplist:

Recordings
Frederick Swann has recorded two compact discs playing the Crystal Cathedral organ:
Four Organ Masterworks
Hymns on the Crystal Cathedral Organ

Peter Baicchi has recorded one CD:
Organ Under Glass : The Crystal Cathedral Organ

The Crystal Cathedral Choir and organ are heard on the CD We Sing the Power.

References

Crystal Cathedral organ
Culture of Garden Grove, California